Atlantis Lucid Dreaming is a compilation album released by the symphonic metal band Therion. Compilation contains tracks from A'arab Zaraq - Lucid Dreaming (1997) and Crowning of Atlantis (1999).

Track listing

External links
 
 Information about album at the official website

2005 compilation albums
Therion (band) compilation albums
Nuclear Blast compilation albums